Ambrogio Talento (died 1528) was a Roman Catholic prelate who served as Bishop of Asti (1528).

Biography
On 23 Mar 1528, Ambrogio Talento was appointed during the papacy of Pope Clement VII as Bishop of Asti.
He served as Bishop of Asti until his death in Aug 1528.

References

External links and additional sources
 (for Chronology of Bishops) 
 (for Chronology of Bishops) 

16th-century Italian Roman Catholic bishops
Bishops appointed by Pope Clement VII
1528 deaths